The Xiaowa Formation is a Carnian-age geological formation found in southern China. It is a sequence of limestone and marls from the Carnian stage of the Triassic. Its lower section was previously known as the Wayao Formation or Wayao Member of the Falang Formation (a nomenclature still used by some authors). In 2002, the Wayao Member was renamed and raised to the Xiaowa Formation to prevent confusion with an Eocene unit of the same name. Crinoids and marine reptiles are abundant in the Xiaowa Formation, forming a lagerstätte known as the Guanling biota. Ammonoids and conodonts found in the formation constrain its age to the early Carnian. Reptiles of the Guanling biota include ichthyosaurs, thalattosaurs, placodonts, and Odontochelys (an early relative of turtles). Sedimentary events within this formation have been tied to the Carnian Pluvial Event.

Geology
The Xiaowa Formation has three members. The lower member is relatively thin but is also very fossiliferous. It begins with thick-bedded grey biomicrite (fine-grained fossiliferous limestone) interbedded with greenish shale. Bivalves and crinoid fragments are the most common fossils in the biomicrite layers, which sometimes grade upwards to dark grey laminated marls. The lower section of the lower member represents a relatively well-oxygenated pelagic environment. The lower member then transitions to a section of darker and more clastic layers indicative of anoxic conditions and reduced reef activity. Most of the articulated crinoids and vertebrate fossils of the Guanling biota hail from a dark grey micrite at the base of the lower member's upper section. This is followed by dark grey marls and black shale rich in bivalves, ammonoids, and slightly radioactive clay minerals. The lower member concludes with a sequence of dark grey laminated marls incorporating conodont fossils and silty quartz grains.

The middle member of the Xiaowa Formation is by far the thickest unit and includes thick-bedded grey limestone and marl layers interbedding with each other. Sediment deformation is characteristic of layers in this member, while fossils are represented mainly by occasional bivalves and ammonoids. The middle member represents a deep-water environment influenced by tectonic events which disturb sediment layers and create distant turbidites that periodically supply increased clastic material. The upper member is mostly dominated by laminated limestone. Though marl interbedding and fossils are practically absent, silty to sandy quartz grains are common and dominate the last few meters of the formation. This member represents a shallower ocean environment (likely raised by tectonic uplift) supplied with dust from terrestrial areas

Paleobiota
The Xiaowa Formation encompasses several biostratigraphic zones. The Protrachyceras costulatum ammonoid zone of the upper Zhuganpo Formation continues into the first few meters of the Xiaowa Formation's lower member. However, the rest of the lower member (including the Guanling biota) belongs to the Trachyceras multituberculatum ammonoid zone. This unit has also been called the Austrotrachyceras triadicum zone, and is likely equivalent to the T. aon or T. aonoides zone of the western Tethys (Europe). The middle member of the Xiaowa Formation belongs to the Sirenites cf. senticosus ammonoid zone.

Bivalves

Brachiopods

Cephalopods

Conodonts

Echinoderms

Fish

Reptiles

References

Geologic formations of China
Triassic System of Asia
Triassic China
Carnian Stage
Paleontology in Guizhou